Job Peak is a summit in the U.S. state of Nevada.

Job Peak was named after Moses Job, proprietor of a local toll road.

References

Mountains of Churchill County, Nevada